Juan Rodolfo Marín (1909 – 10 April 1967) was a Chilean journalist and politician.

Career
Juan Rodolfo Marín started in journalism when he joined the Coquimban newspaper .

Marín served in that position throughout his presidency, until 4 November 1958.

In 1963 he was awarded the National Prize for Journalism, with mention in the Feature category. The following year the Municipality of Coquimbo named him an Illustrious Son, and that September he published the text Historia de la Pampilla that recounts the history of the Coquimban Pampilla Festival.

Personal life
Juan Rodolfo Marín was married to Ilda Arqueros Espinoza, with whom he had one son, Juan Gutenberg.

Marín died at the San Juan de Dios Hospital in Santiago on 10 April 1967.

References

1909 births
1967 deaths
Governors of provinces of Chile
Chilean journalists
Chilean city councillors
People from Coquimbo
20th-century journalists